Bowl Island is an island with a bowl-like depression in the center, lying just south of Crohn Island at the head of Amundsen Bay, Enderby Land. It was sighted in 1956 by an Australian National Antarctic Research Expeditions field party and given this descriptive name.

See also 
 List of Antarctic and sub-Antarctic islands

References
 

Islands of Enderby Land